Santara or Bhairarasa is a medieval ruling dynasty of Karnataka, India. The area covered by their kingdom included territories in the Malenadu region as well as the coastal districts of Karnataka. Their kingdom had two capitals. Karkala in the coastal plains and Kalasa in the Western ghats. Hence the territory they ruled was also known as the Kalasa-Karkala kingdom. The Santaras were Jains and had matrimonial relations with the Saivite Alupa royal family. The Santaras became the feudatories of the Vijayanagara Empire after its rise. During this period, the Santara ruler Veera Pandya Bhairarasa erected the monolith of Bahubali in Karkala. The dynasty passed into oblivion after invasions by the Nayakas of Keladi and later by Hyder Ali

Origins

Jinadatta Raya or Jindutt Rai, a Jain prince from Mathura in Northern India was the supposed founder of the dynasty. He is said to have migrated to the town of Humcha with an idol of the Jain deity Padmavati laying the foundation of the kingdom in Humcha. He also built the Humcha Jain temples.

Edgar Thurston mentions that the Bhairarasas or Santaras were among the powerful Bunt chiefs who seem to have exercised control over a greater part of the Tuluva country before the rise of the Vijayanagara Empire. The dynasty founded by Jinadatta appears to have split into two branches by the 12 century C.E. One branch being stationed in Kalasa and another in Hosagunda of Shimoga district. Gradually these branches shifted their capitals to Keravashe and Karkala both in the old South Canara district.

The Santaras built a number of Jain monuments and were responsible for the spread of Jainism in the Tulu Nadu and Malenadu region of Karnataka. They donated two villages for maintenance of Jain monks at Panchakuta basadi at Nagar taluq of Shimoga district.

Notes

References

Citations

Sources
 

Dynasties of India
Jain dynasties
Bunt (community)